Ruud ter Heide (born 15 October 1982) is a Dutch former professional footballer who played as a striker.

Career
Born in Enschede, Overijssel, Ter Heide started his career with FC Twente. He had 5 caps from 2001 until 2003. In the 2003–04 season, he played with German team Eintracht Nordhorn where he got 30 caps and 24 goals. In the next season (2004–05), he switched to SV Werder Bremen where he got 31 caps and 7 goals, he scored no goals in the next season (2005–06). He played once again in the Netherlands and this time with the AGOVV Apeldoorn since 2006. He has 37 caps and 19 goals up to date with the club, with whom he is currently numbered 9.

In the early days of 2010, he was loaned to FC Emmen for the remainder of the season. Ter Heide impressed Emmen with his goalscoring abilities, so they signed him for the club on 4 June 2010.

In April 2010, he was linked to a move to Scottish side Dundee United and English team Middlesbrough, who are currently in the Football League Championship.

Personal life
On 5 July 2018, Ruud ter Heide was, together with his brother Frank, sentenced to 12 years in prison for stabbing two brothers, wounding one of them fatally. The brothers ter Heide both remained silent throughout the entire trial.

References

External links
 Voetbal International Profile

1982 births
Living people
Dutch footballers
Footballers from Enschede
Association football forwards
AGOVV Apeldoorn players
FC Twente players
SC Cambuur players
FC Emmen players
SV Werder Bremen II players
PEC Zwolle players
Eredivisie players
Eerste Divisie players
Expatriate footballers in Germany
Dutch expatriate footballers
Dutch expatriate sportspeople in Germany
Sportspeople convicted of crimes